"200"  is the sixth episode of the science fiction television series Stargate SG-1s tenth season, and the 200th episode of the series overall. Unlike the more serious nature of the season's story arc, "200" is a light-hearted parody of both Stargate SG-1 and other sci-fi shows, as well as popular culture like The Wizard of Oz.

"200" won the 2007 Constellation Award for Best Overall 2006 Science Fiction Film or Television Script, and was nominated for the 2007 Hugo Award for Best Dramatic Presentation, Short Form. The episode also marks the first time original SG-1 member Jack O'Neill (Richard Dean Anderson) is seen since the beginning of Season 9.

The episode received a 1.9 average household rating, one of the few episodes of the season that surpassed the average rating of Stargate SG-1s previous season. "200" also received near-universal praise for its humor and writing. Despite the strong performance of the episode, the Sci-Fi Channel announced soon after the episode's airing it would not be renewing the series for another season.

Plot
Martin Lloyd (Willie Garson), an extraterrestrial turned Hollywood writer, returns to Stargate Command looking for assistance from SG-1 with his script for the movie adaptation of the television show Wormhole X-Treme, based on the exploits of the Stargate Program. The team, especially Lt. Colonel Mitchell (Ben Browder), is reluctant to help. Mitchell is excited about his next off-world mission because it marks his 200th trip through the Stargate. Technical glitches prevent the team from setting off on their mission. General Landry (Beau Bridges) orders SG-1 to help Lloyd, as the government believes a successful science fiction film about intergalactic wormhole travel will serve as a good cover story to keep the real Stargate program a secret.

The notes session devolves into the team members pitching their own versions of a successful sci-fi film, including a zombie invasion (from Mitchell), a previously unseen mission where O'Neill became invisible (from Carter), "tributes" to The Wizard of Oz and Farscape (from Vala), and Teal'c as a private investigator (from Teal'c himself). Also featured are a vignette of the team's mental image of a "younger and edgier" SG-1 (sparked by the studio's suggestion to replace the original Wormhole X-Treme cast), a suggested scene by Martin that turns out to be both scientifically inaccurate and highly derivative of Star Trek, a re-imagined version of the SG-1 pilot episode where all the characters are marionettes in the style of the television series Thunderbirds, and an imagined wedding that features the return of General O'Neill (Richard Dean Anderson). The studio decides to cancel the movie in favor of renewing the series. The end of the episode shifts ten years into the future, where the Wormhole X-Treme cast and crew celebrate their 200th episode, as well as renewed plans for a movie.

Production
"200" follows up on the events of the Season 4 episode "Point of No Return" and the Season 5 episode "Wormhole X-Treme"; the episodes feature the character of Martin and are self-referentially written. In comparison, "200" riffs on science fiction and genre television more broadly. In comparison to attitudes that fans are largely powerless and in opposition to producers, the episode posits fans as empowered shapers of entertainment.

Executive producer Robert C. Cooper originally proposed they write a normal script for the 200th episode. However it soon became clear that deciding who would have the privilege of writing the 200th episode would be awkward. This led to the idea to create a sketch episode in the manner of Saturday Night Live, with each writer creating a vignette. The episode took shape when the writers thought to bring back Wormhole X-Treme and the character of Martin, and frame the whole episode as a notes session. By the end of the writing process the episode had turned into "an homage to the cast, crew, and die-hard fans."

Stargate producers were not sure actor Richard Dean Anderson would return for the episode, so they devised many scenes where Anderson was "in" the episode but not actually shown.  However, Anderson was willing to return and appeared in several scenes. In the DVD special Stargate SG-1: Behind the 200th Cooper said, "it was a big deal for us to have [him] back for the 200th episode. We obviously didn't think we could do it without him."

Despite the markedly different content of the episode, "200" took no longer to shoot than a normal episode, mainly because much of the filming took place on the briefing room set. On the other hand, the episode was much more expensive than a typical one, due to the unusual sequences. For example, the marionettes used in an elaborate spoof of the series were created by the Chiodo brothers, who also made the puppets for Team America: World Police; each puppet was expensive, and the wires pulling each puppet had to be readded by CGI in post production because they didn't show up well enough. Several existing sets were used as stand-ins; for example, the bridge of the Odyssey was used for a Star Trek: The Original Series spoof, while a set from the sister production Stargate: Atlantis was used as the chamber of the Wizard of Oz.

In an interview about the tenth season of Stargate, Cooper and series co-creator Brad Wright stated that there was a fine line between the humor of regular episodes turning into camp. While jokes for the joke's sake are usually limited in normal episodes, the line between humor and camp is deliberately crossed frequently in "200". The producers even talked about recreating a part of Blazing Saddles that breaks the fourth wall, but they could not afford the horses.

The producers made sure that the episode was well-publicized, dropping hints that Anderson's character O'Neill would return for the episode. Joe Mallozzi, executive producer for the series, also hinted that series fans would finally meet the Furlings, an enigmatic race referenced in the second-season episode "The Fifth Race" but never seen. Despite the outlandish scenes filmed for the episode, many of the writers' favorite moments did not make it to production due to time constraints. For example, Cooper noted that a Gilligan's Island skit was cut from the script.

Cultural references
Most of the episode is devoted to references and allusions to other works, as well as the show itself. The title sequence is deliberately shorter than most other episodes, poking fun at shows like Lost as well as the Sci-Fi Channel itself, which had shortened SG-1's Season 9 opening but changed it back after fans demanded it. When Martin learns that his main actor has backed out of the movie, the SG-1 team offers various suggestions for how to replace him or work around his non-availability—a reference to Michael Shanks's absence from the sixth season of Stargate SG-1. Anderson himself also pokes fun at the ending of the eighth-season episode "Moebius", which was intended to be the series finale before the ninth season was announced. The final scene of "200", which features interviews with the Wormhole X-Treme cast, was added as an afterthought, and contains comments from the real cast which were used out of context as an inside joke.

The episode also riffs on other science fiction shows. Early in the episode, Dr. Jackson asks why anyone would make a movie version of a TV series that lasted only three episodes—Teal'c responds that it had strong DVD sales. This is a reference to the series Firefly, which Fox executives decided to cancel after airing only three episodes (although 14 episodes had been filmed, and 11 of them were actually aired—8 more after the cancellation announcement had been made). The high number of DVDs of these episodes that sold afterwards justified making a feature film based on the series, Serenity. (Firefly is again referenced when Lloyd refuses to use footage from the Wormhole X-Treme series for the movie, saying that "it's a movie, not a clip show." This is an allusion to Joss Whedon's insistence that the movie Serenity would not use footage from the original series because it is "not a clip show".) In addition, one of the sequences is a parody of the original Star Trek series, with SG-1 standing in for the crew of the Enterprise. Brad Wright, the co-creator of the series, fills in as the engineer Montgomery Scott. The episode also pokes good-humored fun at the series Farscape, including its habit of inventing swear words. The Farscape sequence itself is an in-joke, since the Stargate: SG-1 actors Ben Browder and Claudia Black had both starred in the earlier series (and indeed Black reprises her original role of Aeryn Sun, though Browder plays a different character, Stark, while Michael Shanks portrays Browder's Farscape character, John Crichton). Several other shows and movies are parodied, including The Wizard of Oz (the story is re-told with the members of the SG-1 team as the adventurers in Oz. The writers based the parody on a fan painting they had hanging in their office). The episode also makes fun of 24'''s "ticking clock of jeopardy", and an entire sequence is enacted with all the characters played by marionettes, in the style of Thunderbirds and Team America: World Police.

Reception
The episode won the 2007 Constellation Award for Best Overall 2006 Science Fiction Film or Television Script, and was nominated for the 2007 Hugo Award for Best Dramatic Presentation, Short Form. Richard Dean Anderson also won a SyFy Genre Award for his guest appearance in the episode.

The episode was generally well received. IGN declared the episode "one of the smartest and funniest hours of television to grace the small screen yet this season." They went on to applaud the decision not only to parody other works but the show itself. Maureen Ryan of the Chicago Tribune agreed, but also noted that "you don't need to be a longtime fan of the long-running program to enjoy its jibes at sci-fi clichés or expedient writing." Eclipse Magazine noted that although the episode was "not a work of comic genius", "200" was the best comedy episode of the series.

The highly publicized debut of the episode garnered a 1.9 average household rating, a 36% jump from the previous episode, and the first episode of the tenth season to reach or exceed the previous season's rating of 1.8; Stargate SG-1 at that point was averaging about 3.3 million viewers per regular episode in the United States.

Cancellation
Shortly after this episode was aired, Gateworld announced that the Sci-Fi Channel had decided to not renew Stargate SG-1 for the coming year. The Channel later confirmed this decision, at the same time announcing that Stargate Atlantis had been picked up for another season. Many fans denounced Gateworld's cancellation announcement, both the timing of it (apparently it had been made while the cast and crew were celebrating the episode's airing)—and the decision itself, on the ground that, while ratings were not as high as they had been in previous seasons, the series was still drawing an audience of a respectable size. (For example, it had a season average of 2 million viewers in Australia, half of them in the 18–49 demographic.) Sci Fi responded that the cancellation decision had not been based on ratings so much as a feeling the series had run its course. Some of the main characters in SG-1 re-appear later in episodes of Atlantis and Universe and in the direct-to-DVD sequel films, Stargate: The Ark of Truth and Stargate: Continuum''.

References

External links

 200 at mgm.com
 
 200  at scifi.com
 Screenplay 

Stargate SG-1 episodes
2006 American television episodes